Ningbo Campus is a campus of Zhejiang University located in the Ningbo Higher Education Park, Ningbo, Zhejiang Province.

History 
In 2001, Zhejiang University established the Ningbo Institute of Technology as an independent college, thus acquiring its Ningbo campus. The independent college is a type of collaboration between the public university and the business sector in China, which awards its own degree independently. Since 2019, these colleges have been transformed to be separated from the public university that they are affiliated to. The Ningbo Institute of Technology was transformed into NingboTech University as a provincial public university, but remains on the campus as a collaboration between Zhejiang University and the Ningbo Municipal Government.

In October 2016, the Polytechnic Institute, Zhejiang University started recruiting students for its Ningbo branch. Since 2016, Zhejiang University expanded collaboration with the Ningbo Municipal Government. In August 2018, a further agreement was signed between the university and the government  to form its Ningbo Campus by establishing the Institute of Ningbo, the International School of Design and the Ningbo branch institution of Polytechnic Institute, relocating the School of Software Technology and improving the academics of NingboTech.

Institutions 

 NingboTech University
 School of Software Technology, Zhejiang University
 Polytechnic Institute, Zhejiang University
 Institute of Ningbo, Zhejiang University
 International School of Design, Zhejiang University

References

Places of Zhejiang University
 
Education in Ningbo